The 2013 season was Helsingin Jalkapalloklubi's 105th competitive season.  HJK is the most successful Finnish football club with 25 Finnish Championships, 11 Finnish Cup titles, 4 Finnish League Cup titles and one appearance in the UEFA Champions League Group Stages.

Squad

Out on loan

Transfers

In

 Transfer announced on the above date, being finalised on 1 January 2013.

Out

Loans in

Loans out

Trial

Competitions

Veikkausliiga

Results summary

Results

League table

Finnish Cup

League Cup

Group 2

Knockout stages

UEFA Champions League

Qualifying phase

Squad statistics

Appearances and goals

|-
|colspan="14"|Players from Klubi-04 who appeared:

|-
|colspan="14"|Players away from the club on loan:

|-
|colspan="14"|Players who left HJK during the season:

|}

Goal scorers

Clean sheets

Disciplinary Record

References

2013
Hjk